A point d'appui (French for fulcrum), in military theory, is a location where troops are assembled prior to a battle. Often a monument is erected to commemorate the point d'appui for notable battles. In some battles there may be more than a single point d'appui.

Examples
In Scotland, the Catto Long Barrow is located at the point d'appui of a historic battle between Vikings and Picts in eastern Aberdeenshire.

See also
 Maneuver
 Staging area
 Schwerpunkt, a term with a similar literal meaning though not a similar military meaning

Line notes

References
 F. C. Heath (1911) The Royal Engineers Journal, vol. XIV, Royal Engineers Institute, W. & J. Mackay & Co., Ltd
 C. Michael Hogan (2008) Catto Long Barrow fieldnotes, Modern Antiquarian 

Military operations